Slieve Bearnagh is one of the Mourne Mountains in County Down, Northern Ireland. Its summit is crowned by two tors with a gap between them, giving it a distinctive shape. The Mourne Wall crosses the summit of Slieve Bearnagh east to west. Paths lead to the cols on either side of the mountain, namely Pollaphuca ("pool of the púca") to the west and Hare's Gap to the east. From the latter, one can also descend southwards to the head of the Ben Crom reservoir.

References

Marilyns of Northern Ireland
Hewitts of Northern Ireland
Mountains and hills of County Down
Mountains under 1000 metres